The Philippines is a sovereign island country in Southeast Asia situated in the western Pacific Ocean. It is a founding member of the United Nations, World Trade Organization, Association of Southeast Asian Nations, the Asia-Pacific Economic Cooperation forum, and the East Asia Summit. It also hosts the headquarters of the Asian Development Bank. The Philippines is considered to be an emerging market and a newly industrialized country, which has an economy transitioning from being one based on agriculture to one based more on services and manufacturing.

For further information on the types of business entities in this country and their abbreviations, see "Business entities in the Philippines".

Largest companies 
This list shows companies included in the 2022 Forbes Global 2000, which ranks companies based on four measures: sales, profit, assets and market value. The list only includes publicly traded firms.

Notable companies 

This list includes notable companies with primary headquarters located in the country. The industry and sector follow the Industry Classification Benchmark taxonomy. Organizations which have ceased operations are included and noted as defunct.

See also 
 Economy of the Philippines
 Business process outsourcing in the Philippines

References 

Philippines
Companies of the Philippines